Acastidae is a family of trilobites in the order Phacopida, suborder Phacopina, superfamily Acastoidea, containing the following genera:

References

 
Acastoidea
Trilobite families